Buková is a village and municipality of Trnava District in the Trnava region, Slovakia. The village is located in the Little Carpathians and Buková reservoir is located nearby. The surrounding is a natural protected area. Near the village center are the ruins of the Ostrý Kameň Castle.

See also
 List of municipalities and towns in Slovakia

References

Genealogical resources

The records for genealogical research are available at the state archive "Statny Archiv in Bratislava, Slovakia"

 Roman Catholic church records (births/marriages/deaths): 1787-1900 (parish A)

External links
Buková at the Statistical Office of the Slovak Republic
Surnames of living people in Bukova

Villages and municipalities in Trnava District